Roll Over and Play Live is a live album of instrumental rock music by Ronnie Montrose.   It was recorded at Magnolia's in Santa Rosa, California in the summer of 1995.  It features five original songs: "Feet First", "Cold Film", "Seven Men Riding", "Jungle Boy" and "Greenthing". "Greenthing" adds in a few "Rock Candy" elements from the  Montrose album. "Primary Function", "Indigo Spheres", "Largemouth" and "Wish in One Hand" are from the Music From Here album. "Sidewinder" originally appeared on the album The Speed Of Sound.

Track listing 
 "Feet First" (Ronnie Montrose) - 7:47
 "Primary Function" (Montrose, Michele Graybeal, Craig McFarland) - 5:01
 "Indigo Spheres" (Montrose, Graybeal, McFarland) - 8:02
 "Cold Film" (Montrose) - 6:19
 "Seven Men Riding" (Montrose) - 5:56
 "Jungle Boy" (Montrose) - 6:22
 "Largemouth" (Montrose, Graybeal, McFarland) - 6:18 
 "Greenthing" (Montrose) - 6:35
 "Sidewinder" (Montrose) - 8:07
 "Wish in One Hand" (Montrose, Graybeal, McFarland) - 5:12

Personnel 
 Ronnie Montrose – Guitar
 Michele Graybeal Montrose - Drums
 Craig McFarland – Bass

Production 
 Produced by Ronnie Montrose
 Remote recording/live mixing by Jim Mathews

References 
 Ronnie Montrose; "Roll Over and Play Live" liner notes; RoMoCo 1999

1999 live albums
Ronnie Montrose albums